Alyaksandr Fedarovich (27 August 1973 – 5 January 2022) was a Belarusian professional footballer who played as a goalkeeper. He is of Polish descent.

Career
Fedarovich holds the record (as of January 2021) for the most appearances for a BATE Borisov goalkeeper, having participated in 262 games in all competitions for the team. After his retirement he went on to work at BATE Borisov as a goalkeeper coach.

Death
Fedarovich died on 5 January 2022, at the age of 48.

Honours
BATE Borisov
Belarusian Premier League: 1999, 2002, 2006, 2007
Belarusian Cup: 2005–06

References

External links
 Player profile on official FC BATE website
 
 
 

1973 births
2022 deaths
Belarusian people of Polish descent
Belarusian footballers
Footballers from Minsk
Association football goalkeepers
Belarus under-21 international footballers
FC Dnepr Mogilev players
FC BATE Borisov players
FC Naftan Novopolotsk players
Association football goalkeeping coaches